IYR may refer to:

 Idaho Youth Ranch, a non-profit charity
 International Youth Rights, a student-run organization

See also

 Iyr